Peter Quilliam OBE (1915 - 11 September 2003) was emeritus professor of pharmacology at the University of London.

He is buried at St Andrew's church, Totteridge, London.

References 

1915 births
2003 deaths
Academics of the University of London
British pharmacologists
Alumni of University College London
Royal Air Force Volunteer Reserve personnel of World War II
Members of the Order of the British Empire
St Andrew's church, Totteridge